Randalstown was a borough constituency which elected two MPs representing Randalstown, County Antrim, to the Irish House of Commons, the house of representatives of the Kingdom of Ireland. It was disenfranchised by the Acts of Union 1800.

Members of Parliament 1692–1801

References

Constituencies of the Parliament of Ireland (pre-1801)
Historic constituencies in County Antrim
1800 disestablishments in Ireland
Constituencies disestablished in 1800